Argyractis parthenodalis is a moth in the family Crambidae. It is found in Argentina.

References

Acentropinae
Moths of South America
Moths described in 1906